The MV Hiyu was a ferry boat operated by Washington State Ferries. Originally built in 1967 to replace an earlier ferry, it was used on the Point Defiance–Tahlequah route during its early years.

History

The Hiyu was slightly bigger and faster than her predecessor, but most importantly, she had a higher clearance in her two center lanes, allowing trucks to reach Vashon Island without having to drive to Fauntleroy.

The Hiyu worked the short route between Vashon Island and Tacoma until the late-1980s. By then, she could no longer handle the increased traffic on the route and was replaced with the 55-car .

Washington State Ferries reassigned her to the San Juan Islands where she served as the inter-island boat, serving San Juan Island, Orcas Island, Shaw Island and Lopez Island.

She was mothballed for over 10 years at Washington State Ferries' maintenance facility in Eagle Harbor. During that period, she was mainly used as a WSF training vessel. She was also used for filming some movies and television commercials, including a commercial for the Seattle Seahawks football team in 1999. Occasionally, she was contracted out for service on the Steilacoom-Anderson Island ferry route when the  needed emergency repairs.

During this time, WSF considered selling this ferry. The Washington State Department of Corrections was interested in using her for service to their prison on McNeil Island. There were also plans to sell her to Whatcom County for them to use at Lummi Island or for ferry service between Blaine and Point Roberts. In the end, nothing came of the plans to sell the Hiyu.

In June 2007, Washington State Ferries put the Hiyu back in service once again between Point Defiance and Tahlequah when the  encountered rudder problems. At the time, Hiyu was the only other ferry available to cover for the Rhody.

On November 20, 2007, the four Steel Electric-class ferries were removed from service, leaving Hiyu as the only back-up ferry in the fleet. She continued to serve as a back-up ferry, but couldn't provide enough capacity on any of WSF's routes. She also couldn't be made ADA-accessible. In the governor's proposed budget for 2009, the Hiyu was slated to be permanently assigned to the Point Defiance-Tahlequah route to allow for the Rhododendrons retirement. The legislature did not approve this proposal, so the Rhododendron remained in service until 2012 when the 64-car  replaced her.

The Hiyu proved useful in December 2012 when three ferries, the Walla Walla, Sealth and Klahowya, were taken out of service and the Hiyu was put on the Vashon-Southworth-Fauntleroy run for six days while repairs were made.

On November 25, 2013, the local TV station KING 5 reported that, since January 2012, WSF had spent $710,000 keeping engineers on the boat almost every day, but that it was only in service for eight days during that time. The head of WSF, David Moseley, said that the expense was minimal, amounting to less than one percent of the total cost of labor for engineers. At the time, WSF was building two new 144-car Olympic-class ferries which entered service in 2014 and 2015. One of them was to allow WSF to have a more adequate backup ferry.

After a year without service, the Hiyu was put back to work in January 2014 on the San Juan Interisland route to cover for the Evergreen State, which had broken down. The Hiyu was in service during two days until the regular ferry was repaired. On July 23, 2015, the Hiyu was put in service for the last time, sailing on the Fauntleroy-Vashon-Southworth route, which was otherwise running on a 2-boat schedule due to vessel moves elsewhere in the WSF system, which were made to accommodate emergency repairs to the MV Puyallup and MV Elwha while maintaining reasonable service throughout the WSF system. On May 17, 2016, WSDOT announced that the Hiyu had been officially retired and that it would soon be put up for sale.  In October 2016 the State of Washington Surplus Operations ran an auction for Hiyu, ending with no sale. A second auction for the vessel later in the year also failed to find a buyer, but in February 2017 the state reached an agreement to sell Hiyu to a private buyer who would use her as a floating entertainment venue on Lake Union.

References

Washington State Ferries vessels
1967 ships
Ships built in Portland, Oregon